Bourcard Binelli (born 19 January 1958) is a Cameroonian wrestler. He competed in the men's freestyle 100 kg at the 1980 Summer Olympics.

References

1958 births
Living people
Cameroonian male sport wrestlers
Olympic wrestlers of Cameroon
Wrestlers at the 1980 Summer Olympics
Place of birth missing (living people)